Phyllidiella meandrina is a species of sea slug, a dorid nudibranch, a shell-less marine gastropod mollusk in the family Phyllidiidae.

Distribution 
This species was first collected in Mauritius. It was confused with Phyllidiella annulata by Brunckhorst. It is a frequent species in Mauritius and Réunion.

Description
This nudibranch has a black dorsum with longitudinal pink ridges at the sides of the mantle and a series of oval rings in the centre of the back. The rhinophores are black.

Diet
This species feeds on sponges.

References

Phyllidiidae
Gastropods described in 1957